The 2021–22 Toto Cup Al is the 37th season of the third-important football tournament in Israel since its introduction and the 16th tournament involving Israeli Premier League clubs only.

Maccabi Tel Aviv are the defending champions.

Format changes
The four clubs playing in the UEFA competitions (Maccabi Haifa, Maccabi Tel Aviv, F.C. Ashdod and Hapoel Be'er Sheva) will not take part in the group stage, while the remaining ten clubs were divided into two groups of five, at the end of the group stage each of the group winners will qualify to the semi-finals. Maccabi Haifa and Maccabi Tel Aviv will play in the 2021 Israel Super Cup match for a place in one of the semi-finals  (meeting the group winner with the least points accumulated), while F.C. Ashdod and Hapoel Be'er Sheva will play for a place in the other semi-final (meeting the group winner with the most points accumulated) . All clubs will participate in classification play-offs to determine their final positions.

Group stage
Groups were allocated according to geographic distribution of the clubs, with the northern clubs allocated to Group A, and the southern clubs allocated to Group B. Each club will play the other clubs once.

The matches were scheduled to start on 31 July 2021.

Group A

Group B

European qualification route

Israel Super Cup

UEFA qualifiers match

Classification play-offs

13–14th classification match

11–12th classification match

9–10th classification match

7–8th classification match

5–6th classification match

Semi-finals

Final

Final rankings

References

External links

Al
Toto Cup Al
Toto Cup Al